The Mahakali Temple is a Hindu temple situated at Adiware, Rajapur Taluka, Maharashtra state, India.

External links

 http://wikimapia.org/326185/Mahakali-Temple-Adiware

Hindu temples in Maharashtra